The Accidental Honeymoon is a 1918 American silent comedy-drama film directed by Léonce Perret and starring Robert Warwick.

A fragment of the film remains with only a single reel of the 5 reel film existing at the Library of Congress.

Plot
As described in a film magazine, because his fiancée has deceived him, Robert Courtland (Warwick) decides to end his own life. He tries to shoot himself but is interrupted by the telephone. His next attempt is to be beneath the wheels of a fast train. After he has been resting peacefully some time on a carpet and cushion waiting for the train, Kitty Grey (Hammerstein), escaping from an undesirable marriage, calls on Robert for help in fixing her automobile. Robert decides then that he does not want to die after all. They find themselves in an embarrassing position when rain forces them to seek shelter at a farmhouse, and the kindly farmers take them for man and wife. The next day the irate Mr. Gray (Norcross) locates his runaway daughter and puts her in a girls' school, where Robert finds her. With the assistance of a teacher who has loved and lost, Robert and Kitty carry their elopement to a successful finish.

Cast
Robert Warwick as Robert Courtland
Elaine Hammerstein as Kitty Grey
Frank McGlynn, Sr. as Farmer Perkins
Blanche Craig as Mother Perkins
Frank Norcross as Kitty's Father
Edward Kimball as Roland Edwards
Jeanne Méa as Seminar Principal (credited as Madame Mea)
Emily Lorraine as Teacher
Walter Hiers as Jimmy

References

External links
 

1918 films
American silent feature films
Lost American films
Films produced by Harry Rapf
American black-and-white films
1918 comedy-drama films
1918 lost films
Lost comedy-drama films
Films directed by Léonce Perret
1910s American films
Silent American comedy-drama films